Hermann Buchner (30 October 1919 – 1 December 2005) was a former Luftwaffe fighter ace and recipient of the Knight's Cross of the Iron Cross during World War II. The Knight's Cross of the Iron Cross was awarded to recognise extreme battlefield bravery or successful military leadership. Buchner is credited with 46 tank victories and 58 aerial victories, including 12 while flying the Messerschmitt Me 262 jet fighter, accumulated in 631 combat missions.

Early life and career
Buchner was born on 30 October 1919 in Salzburg, at the time in the First Austrian Republic. In 1937, he joined the Luftstreitkräfte (Austrian Air Force). Following the Anschluss in March 1938, the forced incorporation of Austria into Nazi Germany, Buchner was transferred to the Luftwaffe (the Nazi German Air Force). Trained as a pilot, he then served as an instructor with various Luftwaffe training units. He initially served with Fliegerausbildungs-Regiment 22 (22rd Aviators Training Regiment) and then at the Flugzeugführerschule (See) 2 (2nd Sea Pilot School) at Pütnitz, present-day part of Ribnitz-Damgarten. He was then posted to the Jagdfliegerschule (fighter pilot school) at Werneuchen where served with 1. Staffel (1st squadron) from 2 June to 1 November 1941. On 2 November 1941, Buchner was transferred to the Schlacht-Lehr-Ergänzungsgruppe in Lippstadt, a supplementary training unit of Lehrgeschwader 2 (LG 2—2nd Demonstration Wing).

World War II
World War II in Europe had begun on Friday, 1 September 1939, when German forces invaded Poland. In February 1942, his former training unit was redesignated and became 8. Staffel (8th squadron) of Schlachtgeschwader 1 (SG 1—1st Ground Attack Wing), a front line ground attack unit which was sent to the Eastern Front. Buchner's 8. Staffel was equipped with the Messerschmitt Bf 109E. On 7 May 1942, Buchner flew his first combat mission in the Battle of the Kerch Peninsula. With this unit, which was redesigned in late 1943 and became part of II. Gruppe (2nd group) of Schlachtgeschwader 2 "Immelmann" (SG 2—2nd Ground Attack Wing), Buchner fought in the Crimean Peninsula, during the Battle of Stalingrad, and in Romania.

Buchner logged his 300 combat mission on 27 August 1943, his 500th on 4 March 1944. Following his 500th combat mission, at the time credited with 13 aerial victories, he was nominated for Knight's Cross of the Iron Cross. From 1 June 1944 to 1 August 1944, Buchner was appointed as Staffelführer (acting squadron leader) of 4. Staffel (4th squadron) of SG 2. As a ground attack pilot with 6. Staffel (6th squadron) of SG 2, Buchner was credited with 46 tanks destroyed. On 20 July 1944, Buchner was awarded the Knight's Cross of the Iron Cross. At the time, he had been credited with 46 aerial victories, including a Boeing B-17 bomber over Romania, and 46 tank destroyed, claimed in over 600 combat missions. The presentation was made by Oberst (Colonel) Alfred Druschel.

Buchner then briefly served with Schlachtflieger-Ergänzungsgruppe 154 in Proßnitz, present-day Prostějov in the Czech Republic, before on 15 October 1944 he was transferred to Lechfeld Air Base for conversion training to the Messerschmitt Me 262 jet fighter. He flew his first combat mission on the Me 262 on 26 November 1944 and claimed a P-38 Lightning shot down. The P-38 F-5 (work-number 43-28619) belonged to the 22nd Photographic Reconnaissance Squadron and was piloted by Second Lieutenant Irvin J. Rickey who bailed out and became a prisoner of war. He flew a further 19 missions with III. Gruppe of Jagdgeschwader 7 (JG 7—7th Fighter Wing) on the Me 262 and claimed eleven more aircraft shot down. On 18 January 1945, Buchner married the Red Cross nurse Käthe. On 22 February 1945, Buchner, accompanied by his wingman Oberfähnrich Heinz Russel, on a bomber intercept mission, came under attack by P-51 Mustangs of the 352nd, 363rd and 364th Fighter Group. In this encounter, Buchner shot down and killed Lieutenant Francis Radley of the 364th Fighter Group. On 20 March and 22 March 1945 each, Buchner claimed one B-17 bomber of the United States Army Air Forces Eighth Air Force. On 31 March 1945, he claimed an Avro Lancaster bomber shot down.

Later life
Buchner, in the two years following World War II, served as an observer in the weather service of the American occupation forces. He helped found the Aero-Club Salzburg and worked as a flight instructor at glider school Zell am See. Austria regained its political autonomy in 1955 and Buchner joined the newly emerging Austrian Air Force as a flight instructor and officer. Buchner was one of the first pilots trained on the British DH 115 "Vampire" and later the Swedish Saab J-29. He served as a technical officer in the Jagdbomber-Schulstaffel (ground attack training squadron) in Graz under command of Major Karl "Charly" Bleckl. Promoted to Oberstleutnant and staff officer in Jagdbombergeschwader 1 and at the same time surrogate of commander Oberst Bleckl he was made commander of the airfield at Linz-Hörsching in 1979. Buchner retired from active service one year later.

Publications
 Buchner, Hermann (2008) "Stormbird" Manchester, UK: Crecy Classic

Summary of career
During World War II, Buchner logged 631 combat missions, of which 215 on the Messerschmitt Bf 109E, 396 on the Focke-Wulf Fw 190, and 20 on the Messerschmitt Me 262. He was shot down five times, including two bail outs with a parachute, and was wounded twice. Buchner was credited with 58 aerial victories—46 on the Eastern Front and 12 flying the Me 262 in Defence of the Reich. As a ground attack pilot, he was credited with the destruction of 46 tanks and one armoured train.

Aerial victory claims
According to US historian David T. Zabecki, Buchner was credited with 58 aerial victories. Mathews and Foreman, authors of Luftwaffe Aces — Biographies and Victory Claims, researched the German Federal Archives state that he claimed 58 aerial victories. This figure includes 45 claims on the Eastern Front and 13 claims on the Western Front. Buchner claimed 12 victories flying the Me 262 including more than ten four-engined bombers.

Awards
 Crimea Shield
 Honour Goblet of the Luftwaffe (Ehrenpokal der Luftwaffe) on 5 October 1942 as Feldwebel and pilot
 Front Flying Clasp of the Luftwaffe in Gold
 Iron Cross (1939) 2nd and 1st Class
 German Cross in Gold on 17 October 1943 as Feldwebel in the 6./Schlachtgeschwader 1
 Knight's Cross of the Iron Cross on 20 July 1944 as Oberfeldwebel and pilot in the 6./Schlachtgeschwader 2 "Immelmann"
 Silver and Gold Decoration for Services to the Republic of Austria
Hermann Buchner had been nominated for the Knight's Cross of the Iron Cross with Oak Leaves. The nomination was not processed before the end of World War II in Europe.

Notes

References

Citations

Bibliography

 
 
 
 
 
 
 
 
 
 
 
 
 
 
 
 
 
 
 
 
 
 

1919 births
2005 deaths
Luftwaffe pilots
German World War II flying aces
Recipients of the Gold German Cross
Recipients of the Decoration for Services to the Republic of Austria
Recipients of the Knight's Cross of the Iron Cross
Military personnel from Salzburg